The 1800 New Hampshire gubernatorial election took place on March 11, 1800. Incumbent Federalist Governor John Taylor Gilman won re-election to a seventh term, defeating Democratic-Republican candidate Timothy Walker.

Results

References 

Gubernatorial
New Hampshire
1800